The 2026 BWF World Championships will be the 30th edition of the world badminton championships. It will be held in India in 2026.

Host selection 
The host nation India was originally supposed to hold the Sudirman Cup in 2023, however due to all events in China getting cancelled in 2021, the Sudirman Cup was moved to Vantaa in Finland with the 2023 Sudirman Cup going to Suzhou, China. India thereby was selected as the hosts of the 2026 World Championships due to the transfer of the hosting rights of 2023 Sudirman Cup.

References 

BWF World Championships
International sports competitions hosted by India
Badminton tournaments in India
BWF World Championships
Badminton World Championships